The girls' singles tournament of the 2018 Badminton Asia Junior Championships was held from July 18 to 22. The girls' singles champion of the last edition was Han Yue from China. The silver medallist in the last edition, Phittayaporn Chaiwan top the seedings this year. China has placed 3 girls (Wang Zhiyi, Zhou Meng, and Wei Yaxin) to fill out the remainder of the top 4 seeded positions.

Seeded

  Phittayaporn Chaiwan (quarterfinals)
  Wang Zhiyi (champion)
  Zhou Meng (final)
  Wei Yaxin (semifinals)
  Chasinee Korepap (second round)
  Hsieh Yu-ying (third round)
  Aakarshi Kashyap (second round)
  Park Ga-eun (quarterfinals)

Draw

Finals

Top half

Section 1

Section 2

Bottom half

Section 3

Section 4

References

External links 
Main Draw

2018 Badminton Asia Junior Championships
Junior
Bad